Giorgos 'Kokos' Elia (born March 11, 1971) is a former international footballer Cypriot 
striker.

External links
 

1971 births
Living people
Cypriot footballers
Cyprus international footballers
Greek Cypriot people
Association football forwards
Nea Salamis Famagusta FC players
Apollon Limassol FC players
AEK Larnaca FC players
Cypriot First Division players